Sri H. W. L. Poonja (born Hariwansh Lal Poonja; 13 October 1910 (or later) in Punjab, British India – 6 September 1997 in Lucknow, India), known as "Poonjaji" or "Papaji" , was an Indian sage.

Biography

Early life

At the age of eight, he claimed he had experienced an unusual state of consciousness:

Meeting Ramana Maharshi

However, rather than giving another vision of God, Ramana Maharshi pointed him in the direction of his own self:

Transformation
He found that he could no longer bring his mind to think of God, do japa or any other spiritual practice. He asked Ramana for help and was told that this was not a problem, that all his practice had carried him to this moment and it could be left behind now because it had served its purpose. When telling Ramana about the story of his search of the Self;

Poonja recognised this as the same state he experienced when he was eight years old, but this time it was permanent.

Teaching others

Poonjaji met two other men "who convinced me that they had attained full and complete Self-realisation.", a Muslim Pir and an unknown sadhu whom he met by the side of a road in Karnataka.

At the end of 1968 Poonja met in Rishikesh Geneviève de Coux (born 1947), — later known as Ganga Mira — a young Belgian seeker, who became his disciple and with whom he would form a new family, after the ancient Vedic polygamic tradition. Their daughter Mukti was born in 1972.

Poonjaji later settled in Lucknow where he received visitors from all around the world. Some well-known students of his and later self-appointed gurus of Neo-Advaita were Eli Jaxon-Bear, Gangaji, Arjuna Ardagh, Catherine Ingram, Isaac Shapiro, Madhukarji, Sam Harris, Dolano, Mooji, and Andrew Cohen, who later distanced himself from Poonja. David Godman moved to Lucknow in 1992, and stayed with him till 1997, and soon became his biographer, in the following years edited and published a number of books on him, including, Papaji Interviews, an anthology of interviews, and Nothing Ever Happened, a three volume 1,200-page biography.

In this biography it is clear that Poonjaji had very strong reservations regarding some of his students that served as gurus:
David: You used to give experiences to a lot of people. Why did you do it if you knew that the effect would not be permanent?

Papaji: I did it to get rid of the leeches who were sticking to me, never allowing me to rest or be by myself. It was a very good way of getting rid of all these leeches in a polite way. I knew that in doing this I was giving lollipops to the ignorant and innocent, but this is what these people wanted. When I tried to give $100 bills to them, they rejected them. They thought that they were just pieces of paper. So I gave them lollipops instead.

David: Many of the people you gave lollipops to left Lucknow thinking that they were enlightened. Does the fact that they accepted the lollipop and left indicate that they were not worthy to receive the $100 bills?

Papaji: If one is not a holy person, one is not worthy to receive the real teaching. Many people think that they have attained the final state of full and complete liberation. They have fooled themselves, and they have fooled many other people but they have not fooled me.

A person in this state is like a fake coin. It may look like the real thing. It can be passed around and used by ignorant people who use it to buy things with. People who have it in their pocket can boast of having a genuine coin, but it is not real. But it has no value. When it is finally discovered to be a fake, the person who is circulating it, claiming that it is real, is subject to the penalties of the law. In the spiritual world, the law of karma catches up and deals with all people who are trafficking in fake experiences.

I have never passed on the truth to those whom I could see were fake coins. These people may look like gold and they may glitter like gold, but they have no real value.

There are many people who can put on a show and fool other people into believing they are enlightened.

David: Many people have heard you say, ‘I have not given my final teachings to anyone’. What are these final teachings, and why are you not giving them out?”

Papaji: Nobody is worthy to receive them. Because it has been my experience that everybody has proved to be arrogant and egotistic…

Teaching through silence
His teaching emphasises that words can only point to ultimate truth, but never are ultimate truth, and that intellectual understanding without directly realising the truth through one's own investigation is not enough. Like Sri Ramana he stressed that teaching through silence was more important than teaching through words. Once, when a French seeker informed Poonja that he was learning Sanskrit to better understand ancient scriptural texts, Poonja replied:

The process
Poonja mentions several events in his own life which "illustrate, in a general way, how the process of realisation comes about."

 "There must be a desire for God, a love for Him, or a desire for liberation. Without that, nothing is possible."
 "This desire for God or realisation is like an inner flame. One must kindle it and then fan it until it becomes a raging fire which consumes all one's other desires and interests."
 "If this inner fire rages for long enough, with sufficient intensity, it will finally consume that one, central, overwhelming desire for God or the Self." 
 The presence of the Master is the final ingredient: "When the Maharshi’s gaze met my vasana-free mind, the Self reached out and destroyed it in such a way that it could never rise or function again. Only Self remained."

Self-enquiry

His message, like that of his teacher Sri Ramana, was always that the Self is already enlightened and free. Like Sri Ramana, he taught self-enquiry, which involved locating a person's sense of "I" and focusing on and investigating this directly. Famous for eschewing all forms of practices or sadhana, Poonja nonetheless recommended self-enquiry as the only practice one should take up, but he didn't want people to take it up as a form of meditation. He would say, “Do it once and do it properly, and your spiritual quest will be over instantly."

Liberation
According to Poonja, Self-realization is in itself liberating from karmic consequences and further rebirth. According to Poonja "karmic tendencies remained after enlightenment, [but] the enlightened person was no longer identified with them and, therefore, did not accrue further karmic consequences." According to Cohen, Poonja "insisted that the realization of the Self had nothing to do with worldly behavior, and he did not believe fully transcending the ego was possible." For Poonja, ethical standards were based on a dualistic understanding of reality and the notion of an individual agent, and therefore were not indicative of "nondual enlightenement: "For Poonja, the goal was the realisation of the self; the illusory realm of relative reality was ultimately irrelevant."

Bibliography

Satsangs
 Wake Up and Roar: Satsang With H. W. L. Poonja (two volumes), edited by Eli Jaxon-Bear
 The Fire of Freedom: Satsang with Papaji by David Godman, published by Avadhuta Foundation
 The Simplest Way by Madhukar, Editions India, 2nd edition, USA & India 2006 (contains Interview with H. W. L. Poonja)

Overview of teachings
 This: Prose and Poetry of Dancing Emptiness (the essence of Papaji's teachings) Edited by Prashanti, published by VidyaSagar Publications and Weiserbooks.com
 The Truth Is (the essence of Papaji's teachings with dialogues) Edited by Prashanti, published by VidyaSagar Publications and Weiserbooks.com

Interviews
 Papaji: Interviews (A collection of Interviews with Poonja) by David Godman, published 1993 by Avadhuta Foundation
 Papaji Interviews & Reflections (earlier Indian edition, essentially a different book), published 1992 by Pragati

Biography
 Nothing Ever Happened (A three-volume biography). by David Godman, published by Avadhuta Foundation

Reminiscences
 My Master is My Self, by Andrew Cohen and Murray Feldman, (1989 account of his relationship with H.W.L.Poonja before the schism)

See also
 Neo-Advaita

Notes

References

Sources

Printed sources

Online sources

External links 
 Avadhuta Foundation, Papaji's Homepage
 Papaji Satsang Bhavan
 Biography of Papaji
 www.papaji.ru Papaji on Russian
 Papaji on soundcloud

1913 births
1997 deaths
20th-century Indian philosophers
Advaitin philosophers
Indian Hindu spiritual teachers
Scholars from Lucknow
Neo-Advaita teachers
Indian spiritual writers
20th-century Indian non-fiction writers
Writers from Lucknow